The Avenue of the Giants is a scenic highway in northern California, United States, running through Humboldt Redwoods State Park. It is named after the coastal redwoods that tower over the route. The road is a former alignment of U.S. Route 101, and continues to be maintained as a state highway as State Route 254 (SR 254).

Route description
The Avenue's southern terminus is at US 101 near Phillipsville, north of Garberville. The Avenue is notable for the coast redwoods that overshadow the road and surround the area. It is from these towering trees that the Avenue of the Giants takes its name. The road winds alongside the scenic Eel River, and connects several small towns such as Phillipsville, Miranda, Myers Flat, Burlington, Weott, Englewood, Redcrest and Pepperwood. The two-lane road has a number of parking areas, picnic sites, and attractions for visitors. The nearby river provides many swimming locations, such as those at the Rockefeller Forest redwood grove.

The route contains the site of the annual "Avenue of the Giants Marathon".

SR 254 is not part of the National Highway System, a network of highways that are considered essential to the country's economy, defense, and mobility by the Federal Highway Administration. SR 254 is eligible to be included in the State Scenic Highway System, but it is not officially designated as a scenic highway by the California Department of Transportation.

Immortal Tree
It has survived not only the ravages of time but also the 1964 flood of the area, a 1908 attempt at logging, and a direct lightning strike which removed the top  of the tree (making its original height close to 300 ft). It is from its age and perceived hardiness that the tree derives its name. Markers are visible on the tree, denoting the heights of where the loggers' axes and the floodwaters struck the tree.

Situated in the northern half of the Avenue, The Immortal Tree is easy to find, and has a large gift shop and parking area in front of it.

Founder's Grove
Near Weott, this grove has an easy 1/2 mile self-guided walk with informational booklets available at the beginning of the trail. The well-travelled trail is a good example of old-growth redwood forest and contains a few very big trees, including the Founder's Tree (346.1. ft. tall) and the Dyerville Giant (c. 370 ft. tall) which fell down in 1991.

Drive-Through Tree
Avenue of the Giants features a tree that visitors can drive through. Shrine Drive-Thru Tree is near the town of Myers Flat. The tree is privately owned; the owner charges $15 or more for a car to drive through it.

Tree House
Not a traditional tree house, this is actually a house that is, albeit partially, built within a giant redwood.

Visible from the road, and with tours available, the front of this house is entered through the hollow trunk of a still-living tree. The front door and windows are clearly visible to passers-by, and the rest of the house adjoins the rear of the tree in a more traditional style.

Eel River and South Fork

The Eel River is the third largest river in California. It carves deep canyons down great mountains, through flat valleys, and past ancient redwood forests. The Avenue of the Giants follows the South Fork of the river, but also includes the branching of the South and Main forks to its north.

History
The Avenue of the Giants was part of U.S. Route 101 until a freeway bypass was completed on August 27, 1960, assuming the 101 designation. The Avenue was then designated as CA Route 254 by Assembly Concurrent Resolution 10.

Major intersections

Gallery

In popular culture
The Avenue of the Giants was featured by Huell Howser in Road Trip Episode 105.

See also

Chandelier Tree
List of giant sequoia groves

References

External links

California @ AARoads.com - State Route 254
Caltrans: Route 254 highway conditions
California Highways: SR 254
The world-famous scenic drive is a 31-mile portion of old Highway 101.
Photos of the Avenue

State highways in California
Roads in Humboldt County, California
U.S. Route 101
Named highways in California